Lucky may refer to:

An adjective of luck

Lucky may also refer to:

Film and television
 Lucky: No Time for Love, a 2005 Hindi-language romance starring Salman Khan, Sneha Ullal, and Mithun Chakraborty
 Lucky, a 2005 short film by Avie Luthra
 Lucky, a 2010 American documentary by Jeffrey Blitz
 Lucky (2011 film), an American crime comedy starring Colin Hanks
 Lucky (2012 Kannada film), a romantic comedy
 Lucky (2012 Telugu film), a romantic comedy
 Lucky (2017 American film), an American drama directed by John Carroll Lynch and starring Harry Dean Stanton
 Lucky (2017 Italian film), Italian name Fortunata, an Italian melodrama directed by Sergio Castellitto
 Lucky (2019 film), American animated film
 Lucky (2020 film), an American horror film starring Brea Grant
 Lucky, a 2020 Belgian film by Olivier Van Hoofstadt
 Lucky (American TV series), a 2003 American dark-comedy series
 Lucky (Indian TV series), a 2006–2007 fantasy-drama series
 "Lucky" (Criminal Minds), a season three episode
 "Lucky" (Medium), a season four episode
 "Lucky" (Parks and Recreation), a season four episode
 "Lucky" (The Secret Circle), a season one episode

Literature
 Lucky (magazine), a 2000–2015 American fashion and lifestyle magazine
 Lucky (memoir), a 1999 book by Alice Sebold
 Lucky: How Joe Biden Barely Won the Presidency, a 2021 book by Jonathan Allen and Amie Parnes
 Lucky (von Ziegesar novel), a 2007 It Girl novel by Cecily von Ziegesar
 Lucky, a 1985 Santangelo novel by Jackie Collins

Music

Albums
 Lucky (Fifteen album) or the title song (1999)
 Lucky (Marty Balin album) (1983)
 Lucky (Melissa Etheridge album) or the title song (2004)
 Lucky (Misato Watanabe album) (1991)
 Lucky (Nada Surf album) (2008)
 Lucky (Towa Tei album) (2013)
 Lucky (Kim Hyun-joong EP), (2011)
 Lucky (Weki Meki EP) or the title song (2018)
 Lucky, a 1994 album by Janitor Joe
 Lucky, a 2008 album by Molly Johnson

Songs
 "Lucky" (Britney Spears song), 2000
 "Lucky" (Jade Eagleson song), 2019
 "Lucky" (Jason Mraz and Colbie Caillat song), 2009
 "Lucky" (Lucky Twice song), 2006
 "Lucky" (Radiohead song), 1997
 "Lucky (In My Life)", by Eiffel 65, 2001
 "(Believed You Were) Lucky", by 'Til Tuesday, 1988
 "Lucky", by Aurora from the album All My Demons Greeting Me as a Friend, 2016
 "Lucky", by Bif Naked from the album I Bificus, 1998
 "Lucky", by Charli XCX from the album Pop 2, 2017
 "Lucky", by the Dead Milkmen from the album Big Lizard in My Backyard, 1985
 "Lucky", by Donna Summer from the album Bad Girls, 1979
 "Lucky", by Exo from the album XOXO, 2013
 "Lucky", by Hoobastank from the album The Reason, 2003
 "Lucky", by Mabel from the album High Expectations, 2019
 "Lucky", by Meghan Trainor from the album Takin' It Back, 2022
 "Lucky", by Seven Mary Three from the album RockCrown, 1997
 "Lucky", by Seventeen from the album An Ode, 2019
 "Lucky", by SR-71 from the albumTomorrow, 2002
 "Lucky", by Richard Wells from the soundtrack of the TV series Being Human, 2011
 "Lucky", by 311 from the album Grassroots, 1994

Other
 Lucky Records, the name of several record labels
 Lucky Starr (singer) (born 1940), stage name of Australian singer Leslie Morrison

Business
 Lucky Air, airline based in China
 Lucky Brand Jeans, an American clothing company
 Lucky, a brand name of LG Corporation, a South Korean conglomerate
 Lucky Lager, a North American beer brand
 Lucky Stores, an American grocery chain

Places

United States
 Lucky, Kentucky
 Lucky, Louisiana
 Lucky, West Virginia

Slovakia
 Lúčky, Michalovce District
 Lúčky, Ružomberok District
 Lúčky, Žiar nad Hronom District

People
 Lucky (name), a list of people with the surname or given name
 List of people known as Lucky or the Lucky, a list of people with the nickname or epithet
 Lucky Ali, Indian playback singer and actor

Fictional characters
 Lucky (Pokémon) or Chansey
 Lucky (Waiting for Godot), in Samuel Beckett's play
 Lucky Chloe, from the Tekken video game series
 Elroy "Lucky" Kleinschmidt, on the animated television series King of the Hill
 Lucky Luke, a cowboy in a series of French language comic books
 Lucky the Dinosaur, a robotic dinosaur at Disney theme parks
 Lucky Santangelo, in The Santangelo Novels book series
 Lucky Spencer, on the television soap opera General Hospital
 Lucky Starr, protagonist of the Lucky Starr series of science fiction children's novels, by Isaac Asimov (as "Paul French")
 Little Miss Lucky, in the Little Miss children's book series by Roger Hargreaves
 Lucky, a dog in the Disney film One Hundred and One Dalmatians and subsequent adaptations
 Lucky, a racer in the video game LEGO Stunt Rally
 Lucky, the main character of the children's novel The Higher Power of Lucky
 Lucky Jack, a rabbit from Disney's Home on the Range
 Lucky Prescott, a girl on the DreamWorks TV series Spirit Riding Free and movie Spirit Untamed
 Lucky, a calico cat from the 2021 Google Doodle browser game Doodle Champion Island Games

Mascots
 Lucky, the leprechaun mascot of the breakfast cereal Lucky Charms
 Lucky, the leprechaun mascot of the Boston Celtics basketball team
 Lucky and To Lucky, mascots of the Hanshin Tigers baseball team in Japan

Other
 Lucky (war dog), received the Dickin Medal for bravery in the Malayan Emergency 
 Lucky (dog), a dog owned by U.S. President Ronald Reagan
 Several types of bets offered by UK bookmakers

See also
 
 
 Luck (disambiguation)
 Lucki (disambiguation)
 Lucky Lindy (disambiguation)